William Charles Cole Claiborne ( 1773–1775 – November 23, 1817) was an American politician, best known as the first non-colonial governor of Louisiana. He also has the distinction of possibly being the youngest member of the United States Congress in U.S. history, although reliable sources differ about his age.

Claiborne supervised the transfer of Louisiana to U.S. control after the Louisiana Purchase of 1803, governing the "Territory of Orleans" from 1804 to 1812, the year in which Louisiana became a state. He won the first election for Louisiana's state Governor and served through 1816, for a total of thirteen years as Louisiana's executive administrator. New Orleans served as the capital city during both the colonial period and the early statehood period.

Early life and career
Claiborne was born in Sussex County, Virginia sometime between 1773 and 1775. His parents were Colonel William Claiborne and Mary Leigh Claiborne. He was a descendant of Colonel William Claiborne (1600–1677), an English pioneer who was born in Crayford, Kent, England, and settled in the Colony of Virginia.

Claiborne studied at the College of William and Mary, then Richmond Academy. At age 16 he moved to New York City, which was then the seat of U.S. Congress, where he worked as a clerk under John Beckley, the clerk of the United States House of Representatives. He moved to Philadelphia with the Federal Government. Claiborne then began to study law.

Congressman from Tennessee
In 1794 Claiborne moved to Tennessee to start a law practice. Governor John Sevier appointed Claiborne to the Tennessee Supreme Court in 1796. In 1797, he resigned his appointment to the court and ran for a seat in the U.S. House of Representatives. He won, and succeeded Andrew Jackson, though he apparently was not yet twenty-five years of age as required by the United States Constitution. Earlier in 1797, he described his age to George Washington in vague terms: "Born, Sir, at a period, when every American Breast palpitated for freedom, I became early attached to civil Liberty. ..."

Claiborne took his seat in the House on November 23, 1797. State records apparently indicate that, when he took his seat, he was 24. Other sources speculate he was 22. His gravestone says he was 23.

Claiborne served in the House through 1801. The United States presidential election of 1800 was decided in the House of Representatives, due to a tie in the Electoral College, by which time Claiborne had already turned 25 years old.

Service in Mississippi Territory
Claiborne was appointed governor and superintendent of Indian affairs in the Mississippi Territory, from 1801 to 1803. Although he favored acquiring some land from the Choctaw and Chickasaw, Claiborne was generally sympathetic and conciliatory toward Indians. He worked long and patiently to iron out differences that arose, and to improve the material well-being of the Indians.

Claiborne was also partly successful in promoting the establishment of law and order in the region. From 1803 to 1804, he offered a two-thousand dollar reward to eliminate, once and for all, a gang of outlaws headed by the notorious Samuel Mason.

Though he looked out for his constituents, his positions on issues indicated a national rather than regional focus. Claiborne expressed the philosophy of the Republican Party and helped that party defeat the Federalists.

When a smallpox epidemic broke out in the spring of 1802, Claiborne's actions resulted in the first recorded mass vaccination in the territory and saved Natchez from the disease.

Louisiana territorial period 
Claiborne moved to New Orleans and oversaw the transfer of Louisiana to U.S. control after the Louisiana Purchase in 1803. Local French and Spanish inhabitants saw it for what it was, a military occupation that they resented and quoted in their remonstrances and meetings that they were no more than conquered subjects who had not been consulted. He governed what would become the state of Louisiana, then termed the "Territory of Orleans", during its period as a United States territory from 1804 until 1812.

Relations with Louisiana's Créole population were initially rather strained: Claiborne was young, inexperienced, and unsure of himself, and at the time of his arrival spoke no French. The white elite were initially alarmed when Claiborne retained the services of free people of color in the militia, who had served with considerable distinction during the preceding forty-year Spanish rule. Claiborne bestowed a ceremonial flag and 'colors' on the battalion, an act which would enmesh him in a duel three years later.

The duel was held in then-Spanish territory, near the current Houmas House plantation, with his arch-enemy Daniel Clark. On June 8, 1807, the Governor was shot through one thigh, with the bullet lodging in the other leg. Claiborne gradually gained the confidence of the French elite and oversaw the taking in of Francophone refugees from the Haitian Revolution.

An event which is now said to have been the largest slave revolt in U.S. history, the 1811 German Coast Uprising, occurred while Claiborne was the territorial governor. However, the American government, over which he presided, had little participation in its suppression. The parish courts, dominated by wealthy planters, imposed quick convictions and sentencing of the black slaves who had survived the fighting. Federal military forces arrived too late to capture the slave rebels or to prevent what amounted to their slaughter at the hands of the local militia, the powerful white planters along the Mississippi River.

Claiborne himself wrote at least twice to parish officials to request that they refer cases to him for executive pardon or clemency, rather than accept the wholesale death sentences that were being handed out in Orleans Parish, as well as in St. Charles Parish and St. John the Baptist Parish. The only known beneficiaries of his pardon were two men named Theodore and Henry, but no records exist of Claiborne refusing any other pardon requests related to the rebellion.

After the Republic of West Florida won a short-lived period of independence (from Spain) in 1810, Claiborne annexed the area to the Orleans Territory on the orders of President James Madison, who determined to consider it as part of the Louisiana Purchase.

After Louisiana statehood 
Claiborne was the first elected governor after Louisiana became a U.S. state, winning the election of 1812 against Jacques Villeré, and serving from 1812 through 1816. On the eve of the War of 1812 he sent interpreter Simon Favre to the Choctaws to attempt to keep them out of the war. Claiborne raised militia companies and negotiated the aid of Jean Lafitte to defend New Orleans from British attack late in 1814.

After his term as governor, Claiborne was elected to the United States Senate, serving from March 4, 1817, until his death on November 23, 1817, which was 20 years to the day after his first day in Congress.

Death and legacy
Claiborne died on November 23, 1817. The Louisiana Courier attributed Claiborne's demise to a "liver ailment". Claiborne was buried at the St. Louis Cemetery Number 1, in New Orleans, then the most prestigious of the city's cemeteries. This was a controversial honor, as it is a Roman Catholic cemetery, while Claiborne was Protestant. He was later re-interred at the Metairie Cemetery in New Orleans.

Claiborne Parish, Louisiana, was named in his honor as were two U.S. counties: Claiborne County, Mississippi; and Claiborne County, Tennessee. The longest street in New Orleans was named in his honor: Claiborne Avenue.

The Supreme Court case Claiborne v. Police Jury established the three distinct governing structures of the U.S. in Louisiana. The decision was only made after Claiborne's death.

The World War II Camp Claiborne was named for him in 1939. This installation is still used today for training the Louisiana Army National Guard, particularly by the 256th Infantry Brigade for road marches and land navigation.

The Claiborne Building is located in downtown Baton Rouge and serves as an administrative center for the Louisiana state government.

In 1993, Claiborne was posthumously inducted into the Louisiana Political Museum and Hall of Fame in Winnfield. He was among the first thirteen inductees into the Hall of Fame.

Family life and descendants
Claiborne's first two wives, Eliza Wilson Lewis and Marie Clarisse Duralde, died of yellow fever in New Orleans, within five years of each other. The child of the first marriage, a little girl named Cornelia Tennessee Claiborne, died the same day as her mother. The second marriage produced a son, William C. C. Claiborne, Jr.

In 1812, Governor Claiborne married a third time, to Suzette Bosque, daughter of Don Bartólome Bosque, a Spanish colonial official. Their child was Sophronië (or Sophronia) Louise Claiborne, who married Antoine James de Marigny, son of Bernard de Marigny.

William Claiborne was the great-great-great-grandfather of fashion designer Liz Claiborne.

Claiborne was related to numerous individuals who served in Congress over several generations. He was the brother of Nathaniel Herbert Claiborne, nephew of Thomas Claiborne, uncle of John Francis Hamtramck Claiborne, granduncle of James Robert Claiborne, great-great-great-granduncle of Lindy Boggs, and great-great-great-granduncle of Claiborne Pell.

See also

List of United States Congress members who died in office (1790–1899)

Footnotes

References

Bibliography

External links

 
 
 
 
  
 
   

1770s births
Year of birth uncertain
1817 deaths
People from Sussex County, Virginia
Claiborne family
American people of English descent
Democratic-Republican Party members of the United States House of Representatives from Tennessee
Democratic-Republican Party United States senators from Louisiana
Democratic-Republican Party state governors of the United States
Governors of Mississippi Territory
Governors of the Territory of Orleans
Governors of Louisiana
Territory of Orleans
Justices of the Tennessee Supreme Court
College of William & Mary alumni
American duellists
American shooting survivors
Burials at Metairie Cemetery